This article discusses the year 2009 in Hungary.

Incumbents
President – László Sólyom
Prime Minister – Ferenc Gyurcsány

Events

March 
March 21 - Prime Minister  Ferenc Gyurcsány announced his intention to resign as Prime Minister.

June 
June 7 - 2009 European Parliament election in Hungary, and the victory of Fidesz party.

July 

July 2 - the Metropolitan Court of Appeal (Fővárosi Ítélőtábla) disbanded the Magyar Gárda (Hungarian Guard Movement) a patriotic-nationalistic association. It was coined a paramilitary, a party-militia, or – sarcastically – an operetta-guard by its opponents and certain media outlets, even though it was never armed. It was in varyingly close relationship with the Jobbik party in Hungary

Births

Deaths

January

 2 January – József Sákovics, 81, Hungarian Olympic fencer.
 6 January – Róbert Ilosfalvy, 81, Hungarian opera singer.

February

 17 February – Gyula Sáringer, 81, Hungarian agronomist.

March

 11 March – Péter Bacsó, 81, Hungarian film director, after long illness.
 12 March – Ferenc Szabó, 88, Hungarian footballer (Ferencvárosi TC).

See also
 List of Hungarian films since 1990

References

 
Years of the 21st century in Hungary
2000s in Hungary
Hungary
Hungary